Hans Pfyffer von Altishofen (28 March 1866 – 5 April 1953) was a Swiss businessman and politician. He was manager of the Grand Hotel National in Lucerne, Switzerland, and later President of the Ritz-Carlton Hotel Company. He was involved in various other enterprises including a bank, railway, power station and paper mill. A passionate advocate of tourism in the Lucerne region, he was a co-founder of the Lucerne Golf Club.

Life

Hans Pfyffer was born in Lucerne on 28 March 1866.
He was the son of the architect Alphons Maximilian Pfyffer von Altishofen (1834–1890), who had built the Grand Hotel National in Lucerne.
He studied medicine, but abandoned this career with the death of his father, and became president of the Grand Hotel National.
Hans Pfyffer founded the limited partnership of "Pfyffer & Cie".
He was manager or a member of the executive board of the Grand Hotel National from 1890 to 1950.
His younger brother Alphons Pfyffer went with César Ritz to Rome, where they opened the Grand-Hotel.
Alphons later became director of the Ritz-Schöpfung and the Excelsior in Rome.

In 1892 César Ritz founded the "Berneralpen Milchgesellschaft" (Bernese Alps Milk Company) which soon became the largest employer in the Konolfingen area. 
Hans Pfyffer became a partner, as did Auguste Escoffier.
In 1893 Pfyffer married Josephine Maria Johanna Reichmann, daughter of the industrialist Heinrich Reichmann of Warsaw.
In 1894 Pfyffer was made Captain of the General Staff of the Swiss army, and in 1917 became a Colonel. From 1917 to 1919 he commanded the Gotthard force.
He was a Conservative member of the Lucerne city council (Stadtrat) from 1899 to 1911, and from 1911 to 1922 was a member of the city parliament (Grosser Stadtrat).
He was a director of various enterprises in central Switzerland including power plants, paper mills and the Vitznau–Rigi Railway.
From 1908 to 1945 he sat on the board of the Luzerner Kantonalbank, of which he was president from 1912 to 1945.
From 1922 to 1924 he was Swiss envoy in Warsaw.

Pfyffer was a passionate promoter of tourism in the Lucerne region, and through his efforts managed to preserve the Grand Hotel National with little damage during the two world wars and the intervening financial crisis.
Pfyffer cofounded the Lucerne Golf Club in 1902 with a 9-hole course on the Dietschiberg, expanded to 18 holes in 1925.
Pfyffer was close to Caesar Ritz, and became president of the Hôtel Ritz Paris, and of the board of the  Ritz-Carlton Hotel Company in London.
Pfyffer once pointed out to Ritz that although the rose brocade-covered dining chairs at the Paris hotel were comfortable, the guests would stay at table longer if the chairs had arms.
Ritz at once ordered all the chairs to be replaced.
The 1948 biography of Cesar Ritz by his wife, Marie Louise Ritz, was dedicated to Colonel Hans Pfyffer d'Altishofon.
Hans Pfyffer died in Lucerne on 5 April 1953.

Notes

Sources

Further reading

1866 births
1953 deaths
Swiss hoteliers